Flowers with Two Lizards is a 1603 painting by Roelant Savery, now in the Centraal Museum in Utrecht. It and a near-identical version by the same artist are the two earliest surviving floral still lifes from the Northern Netherlands.

References

Paintings in the collection of the Centraal Museum
1603 paintings
Dutch Golden Age paintings
Flower paintings